Anabarilius alburnops (also known as silver minnow or silvery white fish, a direct translation of its Chinese name, 银白鱼) is a species of ray-finned fish in the genus Alburnus. It is only known from Dian Lake and Songhuaba Reservoir, both in Kunming, Yunnan. It can reach sizes above  SL.

The species was once common in Dian Lake, but has since 1950s dramatically declined; today, only few individuals are occasionally captured. Its decline is caused by introduced fish species, pollution, the loss of macrophytes (in part due to grass carp), over-fishing, and the loss of breeding sites. Along with many other fish species endemic to Dian Lake, it is a threatened species.

References

alburnops
Fish described in 1914
Endemic fauna of Yunnan
Freshwater fish of China
Endangered fish